The political views and activism of Rage Against the Machine are central in the band's music and public image. Rage Against the Machine is an American rock band formed in Los Angeles in 1991. The band's line-up consists of vocalist Zack de la Rocha, bassist and backing vocalist Tim Commerford, guitarist Tom Morello and drummer Brad Wilk. Critics have noted Rage Against the Machine for its "fiercely polemical music, which brewed sloganeering left wing rants against corporate America, cultural imperialism, and government oppression into a Molotov cocktail of punk, hip-hop, and thrash."

Integral to their identity as a band, Rage Against the Machine often voiced strong criticism of the domestic and foreign policies of the US government. The band and its individual members participated in political protests and other activism throughout its existence, and the band saw its music primarily as a means of spreading ideas. De la Rocha explained that "I'm interested in spreading those ideas through art, because music has the power to cross borders, to break military sieges and to establish real dialogue."

EZLN 

The band are vocal supporters of the Zapatista Army of National Liberation (EZLN), especially De la Rocha, who has taken several trips to the Mexican state of Chiapas to aid their efforts. The flag of the EZLN serves as the primary recurring theme in the band's visual art. Morello described the EZLN as "a guerrilla army who represent the poor indigenous communities in southern Mexico who, for hundreds of years, have been trodden upon and sort of cast aside and which really are the lowest form on the economic-social ladder in Mexico. In 1994, on New Years Day, there was an uprising there and they were led by the very charismatic Subcomandante Marcos which is a group which is tremendously supportive of the "most objectively poor and continues to fight for dignity, for all people in Mexico." An interviewer was once told by De la Rocha, "Our purpose in sympathizing with the Zapatistas is to help spark [real] dialogue."

De la Rocha has been particularly outspoken on the cause of the EZLN. He explained the importance of the cause to him personally.

The EZLN and De la Rocha's experiences with them inspired the songs "People of the Sun", "Wind Below" and "Without a Face" from Evil Empire, and "War Within a Breath" from The Battle Of Los Angeles.

The EZLN flag has been used as a stage backdrop at all of the band's shows since their reunion in April 2007.
 
Zack de la Rocha asked their record label, Epic Records, for $30,000 to donate to the EZLN. It is not known if they complied.

Saturday Night Live incident 

On April 10, 1996, the band was scheduled to perform two songs on the NBC comedy variety show Saturday Night Live. The show was hosted that night by Republican ex-presidential candidate and multi-millionaire Steve Forbes. According to Tom Morello, "RATM wanted to stand in sharp juxtaposition to a billionaire telling jokes and promoting his flat tax by making our own statement." 
To this end, producer Brendan O'Brien suspended two upside-down American flags from their amplifiers. Seconds before they took the stage to perform "Bulls on Parade", SNL and NBC sent stagehands in to pull the flags down. The inverted flags, says Morello, represented: 

The band's first attempt to hang the flags during a pre-telecast rehearsal on Thursday was stopped by SNLs producers, who "demanded that we take the flags down", according to Morello. "They said the sponsors would be upset, and that because Steve Forbes was on, they had to run a 'tighter' show." SNL also told the band it would mute objectionable lyrics in "Bullet in the Head" (which was supposed to be RATM's second song), and insisted that the song be bleeped in the studio because Forbes had friends and family there.

On the night of the show, following the removal of the flags during the first performance, the band was approached by SNL and NBC officials and ordered to immediately leave the building. Upon hearing this, RATM bassist Commerford reportedly stormed Forbes' dressing room, throwing shreds from one of the torn down flags.

Morello noted that members of the Saturday Night Live cast and crew, whom he declined to name, "[e]xpressed solidarity with our actions, and a sense of shame that their show had censored the performance".

Radio Free L.A. 
Radio Free Los Angeles was a radio show held by the band on January 20, 1997, the night of Bill Clinton's second inauguration as President. The show comprised segments and interviews featuring Michael Moore, teen rights activist Emily Hodgson, Leonard Peltier, Chuck D, Mumia Abu-Jamal, UNITE, Noam Chomsky, Amy Ray of the Indigo Girls, and Subcomandante Marcos of the Zapatistas. These were intercut with musical performances by Morello, De la Rocha, Flea and Stephen Perkins playing different versions of Rage songs, as well as Beck and Cypress Hill playing their own songs. The band organized and played the show in response to the re-election of Clinton:

The two-hour show was syndicated by over 50 commercial U.S. radio stations and streamed live from the band's website. Transcripts of the interviews are freely available online.

"Sleep Now in the Fire" video shoot 
On January 26, 2000, filming of the music video for "Sleep Now in the Fire" caused the doors of the New York Stock Exchange to be closed and the band to be escorted from the site by security. The band invited fans to join them in the shoot and approximately 300 showed up. After the breakdown of the shoot, the band members, along with many of their fans, stormed the doors of the NYSE. De la Rocha was shoved away from the entrance after briefly entering through a side door. They then succeeded in forcing the NYSE to lock its doors during the middle of the trading day.

After the incident, Morello was quoted saying, "Our protest stopped trading at the stock exchange for the last two hours of the day. I guess we stopped downsizing for at least a couple of hours."
Footage of enthusiastic Wall Street employees headbanging to the music, police attempting to take Tim Commerford's bass as he refused to quit playing, and the emergency doors of the New York Stock exchange closing  were all used in the final video. "We decided to shoot this video in the belly of the beast", said Moore, who was arrested during the shooting of the video: despite having a federal permit for the location, they did not have a sound permit. Only Moore was arrested in relation to the incident.

The video was nominated at the 2000 MTV Video Music Awards for Best Rock Video. After losing the award to Limp Bizkit's "Break Stuff", bassist Tim Commerford climbed up the fake palm tree behind the podium and refused to come down. He then began shaking the set, which appeared as though it might collapse.  Commerford was eventually coaxed down and was ultimately arrested after a brief scuffle. Tim's actions are widely believed to be the impetus for singer Zack de la Rocha's exit and the end of Rage.

2000 Democratic National Convention 

RATM played a free concert at the 2000 Democratic National Convention in protest of the two-party system. The band had been considering playing a protest concert there since April that year. Although they were at first required by the City of Los Angeles to perform in a small venue at a considerable distance, early in August a United States district court judge ruled that the City's request was too restrictive and the City subsequently allowed the protests and concert to be held at a site across from the DNC. In response, the Los Angeles Police Department increased security measures, including a 12 ft fence and patrolling by a minimum of 2,000 officers wearing riot gear, as well as additional horses, motorcycles, squad cars and police helicopters. A police spokesperson said they were "gravely concerned because of security reasons".

During the concert, De la Rocha said to the crowd, "brothers and sisters, our democracy has been hijacked", and later also shouted "we have a right to oppose these motherfuckers!" After the performance, a small group of attendees congregated at the point in the protest area closest to the DNC, facing the police officers, throwing rocks, and possibly engaging in more violent activity, such as throwing glass, concrete and water bottles filled with "noxious agents", spraying ammonia on police and slingshotting rocks and steel balls. The police soon declared the gathering an unlawful assembly, turned off the electrical supply, interrupting performing band Ozomatli, and informed the protestors that they had 15 minutes to disperse on pain of arrest. Some of the protestors remained, including two young men who climbed the fence and waved black flags, and were subsequently sprayed in the face with pepper spray. Police then forcibly dispersed the crowd, using tear gas, pepper spray and rubber bullets. At least six people were arrested in the incident.

The police faced severe and broad criticism for their reaction, with an American Civil Liberties Union spokesperson saying that it was "nothing less than an orchestrated police riot". Several primary witnesses reported unnecessarily violent actions and police abuses, including firing on reporters and people obeying police commands. Police responded that their response was "outstanding" and "clearly disciplined". De la Rocha said of the incident, "I don't care what fucking television stations said, [that] the violence was caused by the people at the concert; those motherfuckers unloaded on this crowd. And I think it's ridiculous considering, you know, none of us had rubber bullets, none of us had M16s, none of us had billy clubs, none of us had face shields."

Footage of the protest and ensuing violence, along with an MTV News report on the incident, was included in the Live at the Grand Olympic Auditorium DVD.

2008 Republican National Convention 
On September 2, 2008, during the Republican National Convention, Rage Against the Machine was scheduled to play a free show in protest of what De la Rocha called the power abusing party in St. Paul, Minnesota on the State Capital lawn for Ripple Effect. Tom Morello was asked by SuicideGirls to report what happened there. He said:

On September 3, 2008, the band played a concert in Minneapolis at the Target Center, on the second day of the Republican National Convention. The band surprised the crowd when they silently stood on stage while wearing orange Guantanamo Bay-like prisoner suits with black hoods over their heads. They opened up with "Bombtrack".  An impromptu demonstration spilled out into the streets afterwards. 102 people were arrested as riot police ended the gathering.

Iraq War, Fox News, and the "assassination" comments controversy 
At the Coachella 2007 performance, De la Rocha made an impassioned speech during "Wake Up", citing a statement by Noam Chomsky regarding the Nuremberg Trials and subsequent actions by US presidents, as follows:

A clip of De la Rocha's speech found its way to the Fox News program Hannity & Colmes. An on-screen headline read, "Rock group Rage Against the Machine says Bush admin should be shot". Ann Coulter, a right-wing commentator and a guest on the show, stated, "They're losers, their fans are losers, and there's a lot of violence coming from the left wing."

On July 28 and 29, Rage co-headlined the hip hop festival Rock the Bells. On July 28, they made a speech during their performance of "Wake Up" just as they had done at Coachella. During this, De La Rocha made another statement, defending the band from Fox News who he claimed had misquoted him:

On August 24, RATM played Alpine Valley in Wisconsin. They made another speech during "Wake Up".

Subsequently, De la Rocha added Tony Blair, the UK Prime Minister who supported George Bush's 2003 invasion of Iraq, to the list of those who ought to be tried and hanged at the Reading Festival on August 22, 2008. The Reading and Leeds Festivals organizer announced after the 2008 festival that De la Rocha had requested Friday and Saturday slots specifically so he could be back in the US for the Democratic and Republican conventions taking place in the week of the 25th.

Rage Against Torture 
In October 2009, Rage Against the Machine, along with members of Nine Inch Nails, Pearl Jam, R.E.M. and The Roots joined a campaign to close Guantanamo Prison, calling also for the declassification of military records regarding the use of music in torture.  Based on reports that songs by Rage and Nine Inch Nails were used in torture at the controversial facility, the group is filing for further declassification under the Freedom of Information Act.

2010 activism and censorship in Brazil 
On October 9, 2010, RATM made its first gig in Brazil and played at the music festival SWU Music & Arts in Itu. Despite sound problems and some flaws in the organization of the event, the first show on Brazilian soil had a major impact and has received good reviews. Tom Morello wore the cap of the Landless Workers' Movement (known in Brazil simply as MST) during the performance of the song "Wake Up" and the band dedicated "People of the Sun" to that social movement. According to the Brazilian Independent Media Center and other alternative media news websites, the TV channel Multishow, which had announced that would broadcast the full concert, censored the broadcast cutting it short after only 35 minutes of its onset, at the exact moment when the guitarist Tom Morello put on a cap of the MST. Instead of RATM's performance, the channel  aired the erotic television show "Sexytime" that was expected to air 1 hour 25 minutes later.

The channel claimed that the broadcast was interrupted due to technical problems after the public invaded the restricted area of the shooting crew; it has been difficult to confirm which version is true. However, it is undisputed that the praise singer Zack de la Rocha made of the Brazilian Landless Workers' Movement was omitted from the Multishow Channel broadcast, and censorship has occurred at least in this respect. On October 10 Tom Morello stated on his Twitter account: "I understand the network cut away when I put on the PST hat. That means we're winning." And then corrected: "Of course that's MST, not PST. PST stands for Post São Paulo Triatholon."

Abortion rights 
During the band's Public Service Announcement Tour in 2022, the band announced they would donate $475,000 in ticket sale revenue to reproductive rights organisations in Wisconsin and Illinois, and screened statements saying "abort the Supreme Court" at their concerts, following the overturning of Roe v. Wade that restricted access to abortion in the United States.

Other activism 
The band advocates for the release of convicted political prisoner, former Black Panther and life imprisonment inmate Mumia Abu-Jamal, for whom they wrote and recorded the track "Voice of the Voiceless" for their 1999 album The Battle of Los Angeles. The band performed at a benefit concert, and all the proceeds were donated to the International Concerned Family And Friends Of Mumia Abu-Jamal, and De la Rocha spoke before the United Nations Commission on Human Rights in support of Abu-Jamal. The band also raised funds and awareness for political activist and convicted double-murderer Leonard Peltier, and documented his case in the video for "Freedom".

At a 1993 Lollapalooza appearance in Philadelphia, the band stood onstage naked for 15 minutes with duct tape on their mouths and the letters PMRC painted on their chests in protest against censorship by the Parents Music Resource Center. Refusing to play, they stood in silence with the sound emitted being only audio feedback from Morello and Commerford's amplifiers.  The band later played a free show for disappointed fans. Tom Morello was arrested for civil disobedience in October 1997 during a union protest by garment workers and their supporters against the use of sweatshop labor by Guess? Billboards subsequently appeared in Las Vegas and New York featuring a photograph of the band with the caption "Rage Against Sweatshops: We Don't Wear Guess – A Message from Rage Against the Machine and UNITE (Union of Needletrades Industrial and Textile Employees). Injustice. Don't buy it."

Some other controversial stands taken include that of the music video for the song "Bombtrack", in which RATM expresses support for the Peruvian revolutionary organization Shining Path and their incarcerated leader Abimael Guzmán, sentenced for the 1983 Lucanamarca massacre and the Tarata bombing. Over its career, the band played benefit concerts for organizations such as Rock for Choice, the Anti-Nazi League, the United Farm Workers, children's care organization Para Los Niños and UNITE. 1994 saw the band organizing Latinpalooza, a joint benefit concert for the Leonard Peltier Defense Fund, and Para Los Niños. The band also raised funds for Fairness and Accuracy in Reporting, the National Commission for Democracy in Mexico, Women Alive, and played at the Tibetan Freedom Concert on more than one occasion. Album liner notes contained promotional material for AK Press, Amnesty International, the Committee to Support the Revolution in Peru, the Hollywood Sunset Free Clinic, Indymedia, Mass Mic, Parents for Rock and Rap, the Popular Resource Center, RE: GENERATION, Refuse and Resist, Revolution Books, the Rock & Rap Confidential, and Voices in the Wilderness. When the band headlined Reading Festival on August 22, 2008, Getafe Electric Festival on May 30, 2008, and the Pinkpop Festival on June 1, 2008, they came on stage to the sound of a prison klaxon, dressed in orange prison jumpsuits with black sacks over their heads, presumably in reference to the conditions of prisoners at Guantanamo Bay. They remained silent onstage for around a minute until being led to their instruments and performing their opening song, "Bombtrack", still in the prison outfits.

In June 2010, frontman Zack de la Rocha stepped up his campaign to compel the state of Arizona to repeal its controversial immigration law by encouraging artists to boycott performing in the state. In addition, he has said they "are going to be organizing a series of concerts that are respectful of the nature of the boycott in its attempts to isolate the Arizona government but not isolate the people." Rage Against the Machine performed in Los Angeles for the first time in 10 years on July 23, 2010, to protest the Arizona immigration law.

Paul Ryan, the Republican nominee for Vice President in the 2012 election has said that he likes Ludwig van Beethoven, Rage Against the Machine and Led Zeppelin. Tom Morello, the lead guitarist of Rage Against The Machine, wrote an op-ed in Rolling Stone stating that "Paul Ryan's love for Rage Against The Machine is amusing, because he is the embodiment of the machine that our music has been raging against for two decades" and "You see, the super rich must rationalize having more than they could ever spend while millions of children in the U.S. go to bed hungry every night".

See also 

 Music and politics

References

External links
Rage Against The Machine - Revolution In The Head And The Art Of Protest, SeeOfSound, YouTube, September 24, 2010. (documentary film)

Far-left politics in the United States
Political views
Socialism in the United States
Youth rights
Political views by person
Music and politics